The ARIA Music Award for Producer of the Year, is an award presented within the Artisan Awards at the annual ARIA Music Awards. The ARIA Awards recognise "the many achievements of Aussie artists across all music genres", and have been given by the Australian Recording Industry Association (ARIA) since 1987.

The award is given to the record producer(s) who is from, or resides in Australia, and has overall responsibility for the work's production. The accolade is restricted to "A single track, multiple tracks, or an entire album may be submitted for each producer. DVD releases are not eligible. Only  work released during the period of eligibility will be considered. International product is eligible but entrants must accord with the general eligibility criteria for artists. In the case of a co-production, all parties must individually meet the artist eligibility criteria." Producer of the Year is voted for by a judging school, which consists of between 40 and 100 representatives experienced with that genre of music.

Winners and nominees

In the following table, the winner is highlighted in a separate colour, and in boldface; the nominees are those that are not highlighted or in boldface. Nominees for some years are not available in published sources.

The years listed in the first column relate to the year and edition of the awards ceremony. The second column indicates the record producer(s) responsible for the work. The "Work title(s) and original recording artist(s)" column names the work(s) whose production has been nominated, and its original recording artist; the musician is not the nominee unless they were the producer.

Producer of the Year

Producer - Best Produced Album

Notes

References

External links
 

P